Mankin Mansion, also known as Brickworks or as Irvin Place, was built in 1924 as a home and showplace by and for Edward Thurston Mankin, a brick manufacturer.  The architecture of the mansion, inside and out, and of walls, benches, and structures on the grounds, includes many features ingeniously implemented in brick.

The building's architecture is Georgian Revival, a subtype of Colonial Revival architecture.  The house is featured in Foundations in Time II: More of Henrico’s Architectural Treasures, a Henrico County TV film available for viewing online. The mansion was saved from deterioration by its purchase by new owners who renovated it and operate a bed-and-breakfast and a wedding business there.

It was listed on the National Register of Historic Places in 1993. In 1993, the NRHP listing included five contributing buildings, one contributing site, and two contributing structures.

References

Houses on the National Register of Historic Places in Virginia
Colonial Revival architecture in Virginia
Georgian Revival architecture in Virginia
Houses completed in 1924
Houses in Henrico County, Virginia
National Register of Historic Places in Henrico County, Virginia